Dianshizhai huabao or Dianshizhai Pictorial (《點石齋畫報》, 1884–1898) was a Chinese language magazine published in Shanghai in the late 19th century. The profusely illustrated supplement of the Shen Bao newspaper became "wildly popular" among readers. Contributors included graphic artist Wu Youru.

References

Images
Published in Dianshizhai Pictorial

External links

   
 chinaknowledge.de
 Virtual Shanghai Project

History of Shanghai
Magazines established in 1884
Magazines disestablished in 1898
Defunct magazines published in Hong Kong
Newspaper supplements
Magazines published in Shanghai
Chinese-language magazines